Swamp onion is a common name for several plants and may refer to:

Allium madidum, native to Idaho, Oregon and Washington
Allium validum, native to western North America